Islam is a minority religion in Kenya representing 10.9% of the Kenyan population, or approximately 5.2 million people. The Kenyan coast is mostly populated by Muslims. Nairobi has several mosques and a notable Muslim population. The faith was introduced by merchants visiting the Swahili coast, which led to local conversions and foreign Muslims becoming assimilated. This would later result in the emergence of several officially Muslim political entities in the region.

The majority of Muslims in Kenya are Sunni Muslims forming 81% of the Muslim Population, 7% identify as Shia. There are also sizeable populations of Ibadism, Quranist and Ahmadi adherents. In large part, Shias are Ismailis descended from or influenced by oceanic traders from the Middle East and India. These Shia Muslims include the Dawoodi Bohra, who number some 6,000–8,000 in the country. As for the orthodox Twelver Shia presence in Kenya, twentieth-century Pakistani scholar Khwaja Muhammad Latif Ansari played an important role in proselytisation for the resident Khoja community.

Historical overview

Islamic arrival on the Swahili Coast

Muslim merchants arrived on the Swahili Coast around the eighth century. The tension following the death of Mohammad, the prophet of Islam, and the already established trade links between the Persian Gulf and the Swahili Coast were some of the factors leading to this development.

Archaeological evidence attests to a thriving Muslim town on Manda Island by the tenth century AD. The Moroccan Muslim traveller, Ibn Battuta, visiting the Swahili Coast in 1331 AD, reported a strong Muslim presence. Ibn Battuta said: The inhabitants are pious, honourable, and upright, and they have well-built wooden mosques.

On arrival, the Muslims settled along the coast, engaging in trade. The Shirazi intermarried with the local Bantu people resulting in the Swahili people, most of who converted to Islam. Swahili, structurally a Bantu Language with heavy borrowings from Arabic, was born.

Primarily, Islam spread through the interactions of individuals, with the Arab Muslims who had settled in small groups maintaining their culture, and religious practices. Despite encountering local communities, Islam was not ‘indigenised’ along the patterns of the local Bantu communities. Nevertheless, Islam grew through absorption of individuals into the newly established Afro-Arabic Muslim communities. This resulted in more ‘Swahilization’ than Islamization.

There was strong resistance toward Islam by the majority of communities living in the interior. The resistance was because conversion was an individual act, leading to detribalisation and integration into the Muslim community going against the socially acceptable communal life.

Islam on the Swahili Coast was different from the rest of Africa. Unlike West Africa where Islam was integrated to the local communities, the local Islam was ‘foreign’; the Arab-Muslims lived as if they were in the Middle East.

The primary concern for the early Muslims was trade with a few interested in propagating Islam. The arrival of the Portuguese in the fifteenth century interrupted the small work in progress. On the other hand, the interstate quarrels that ensued meant that much effort was now directed towards restoring normality and not Islamization.

The spread of Islam into the interior
Islam remained an urban and coastal phenomenon. The Spread of Islam was low-keyed with no impact amongst the local non-Swahili African Community. There were no intermediary Africans to demonstrate that, adoption of a few Islamic institutions would not disrupt society.

The spread of Islam to the interior was hampered by several factors: for instance, the nature of the Bantu society’s varied beliefs, and scattered settlements affected interior advancement. Other factors included, harsh climatic conditions, the fierce tribes like the Maasai, tribal laws restricting passage through their land, health factors, and the lack of an easy mode of transportation. For Trimingham, the brand of Islam introduced to the region was equally to blame.

Muslim traders were not welcome in the social structures thereby impeding any meaningful progress until the beginning of European occupation.

Other factors affecting Islamic movement into the interior included atrocities committed during slave trading, as these unfavourably affected the spread of Islam. In addition, the embracing of Islam by large portions of coastal tribes in the nineteenth century aided in its spread.

Besides, local Muslim preachers and teachers played major roles in teaching religion (Ar. dīn) and the Qur’ān at the Qur’ān Schools (Swa. vyuo) and madrasa attached to the mosques.

The coming of the second wave of Europeans, in the nineteenth century, brought mixed fortunes to the coastal Muslims, their strong sense of pride and belonging was greatly diminished, with efforts being redirected to self adjustments.

Nonetheless, Muslim agents deployed by Europeans as subordinate labourers to assist in the establishment of colonial administration centres, were advantageously placed throughout the country, bringing the Islamic influence to the interior. Each place where a European installed himself, military camp, government centre, or plantation, was a centre for Muslim influence.

In the interior, the Muslims neither integrated nor mingled with the local communities, yet non-Swahili Africans began joining the Swahili trends in trade with some returning as Muslims. Swahili became the trade and religious language. Alongside the interpersonal contacts, intermarriages also yielded some conversions.

Although coastal rulers did not send missionaries to the interior, local Africans embraced Islam freely through attraction to the religious life of the Muslims. Close integration with the local population helped to foster good relations resulting in Islam gaining a few converts, based on individual efforts.

Subjectively, most of the surrounding Bantu communities had a close-knit religious heritage, requiring strong force to penetrate. The pacification and consolidation by European powers provided the much-needed force to open up the communities for new structures of power and religious expression (Trimingham: 1983:58).

Basically, progress in the spread of Islam in Kenya came between 1880 and 1930. This was when most social structures and the African worldviews were shattered, leaving them requiring a new, wider worldview encompassing or addressing the changes experienced.

Consequently, Islam introduced new religious values through external ceremonial and ritualistic expressions, some of which could be followed with no difficulty.

Socio-culturally, Muslims presented themselves with a sense of pride and a feeling of superiority. Islamic civilisation was identified with the Arab way of life (Ustaarabu), as opposed to ‘barbarianism’ (Ushenzi) hence the domination of a form of Arabism over the local variety of Islam.

The ease, with which Islam could be adopted, meant adding to the indigenous practices, new religious rites and ceremonies to the African ways, with new ways of defining one’s identity by new forms of expression. Mingling with Muslims led to conversion meaning returning home as Muslims and not aliens. Lacunza-Balda shows that Islam could be adopted easily.

Although most of the conversions were of individuals, there were communities that embraced Islam en-masse. Some of these included the Digo and Pokomo of the Lower Tana region. From these communities Islam slowly penetrated inland.

Organised missionary activities

Pioneer Muslim missionaries to the interior were largely Tanganyikans, who coupled their missionary work with trade, along the centres began along the railway line, such as, Kibwezi, Makindu, and Nairobi.

Outstanding amongst them was Maalim Mtondo, a Tanganyikan credited with being the first Muslim missionary to Nairobi. Reaching Nairobi at the close of the nineteenth century, he led a group of other Muslims, and enthusiastic missionaries from the coast to establish a ‘Swahili village’ in the present-day Pumwani.

A small mosque was built to serve as a starting point, and he began preaching Islam in earnest. He soon attracted several Kikuyus and Wakambas, who became his disciples.

Local men converted and having learned from their teachers took up the leadership of religious matters. Khamis Ngige was a prominent local convert of the early outreach. Having learned from Maalim Mtondo, he later became the Imam of the Pumwani Mosque.
Different preachers scattered in the countryside from 1900 to 1920, introducing Islam to areas around, Mt. Kenya, Murang’a, Embu, Meru, Nyeri and Kitui. This serious missionary move interior was out of personal enthusiasm with the influence being highly localised. Only a few Africans were converted, and the impact was short lived.

One example of Shia missionary efforts in Kenya is the work of twentieth-century Pakistani scholar Khwaja Muhammad Latif Ansari. Ansari left South Asia for Kenya in the 1950s, fulfilling his dream of preaching to distant, foreign Shi'i communities. He was already a reputed cleric by that time, but nevertheless joined a number of scholars coming from South Asia into the relatively unheard of Shia community of Kenya. After becoming a resident alim there, Ansari helped the community to become large and prosperous as it is today. He is remembered to this day in the country for an address he delivered at the Arusha Conference in December 1958, in which he emphasised the need for tabligh. A large amount of his efforts were focused on the Khoja community.

Islam in Western Kenya

Muslim traders introduced Islam to the western region between 1870 and 1885. The chief Mumia of Nabongo accorded the Swahili traders warm welcome. During an interethnic war, the Muslims assisted Chief Mumia to overcome his enemies. In return, one Eid day, Chief Mumia, his family and officials of his court converted to Islam. Henceforth, Islam spread to the surrounding areas of Kakamega, Kisumu, Kisii and Bungoma.

The Influence and the new trends in Islamic outreach
Although the struggle for independence in Kenya was a very crucial time for all Kenyans, very little is documented on Muslim’s participation. Given that there were Muslims involved in the negotiation for the inclusion of the Kadhi courts in the Independent Kenya’s constitution, points to key Muslim involvement.

Events in the Muslim world from the nineteen-nineties, the experiences of crises and failures, power and success served as catalysts for the reassertion of Islam in public and private world, through a call for a return to true Islam. John Esposito sees the goal for the revivalisms as transformation of the society through Islamic formation of individuals at the grass roots (1999:20).

The growing religious revivalism in personal and public Islamic life, created awareness on Islamic beliefs, culminating to increased religious observance, building of mosques, prayer and fasting, proliferation of religious programming, publications, and emphasis on Islamic dress and values. Lately, Islamic reassertion in public life, like the quest for the upgrading of the Kadhi Courts in Kenya have not gone unnoticed (Esposito:1999:9).

Contemporary Islamic activisms are indebted to the ideology and organizational model of the Egyptian Muslim Brotherhoods (Ikhwhan) led by Hassan al-Banna and Sayyid Qutb; and the Islamic Society Jamaat-I-Islami led by Mawlana Abul ala Mawdudi. Their ideas and methods of revivalism are observed in different parts of the world today. They blamed the west for misleading the Muslim leaders and the Muslim leaders for blindly following the European ways.

Whereas the Qur’ān and Hadith are fundamental, in responding to the demands and challenges of modernity, revival movements are crucial in spreading and restoring true Islam. Prolonged Muslim awareness has led to attraction to Islam, giving the converted a sense of pride.

Methods used in recent trends of Islamization, are twofold, some directed to the Muslims, and others reaching to non-Muslims. There has been increased social action, building of schools, health facilities, and relief food distribution. Moreover, proselytisation is carried out through print media, broadcasting, increased formation of Missionary organisations, and organisation of public debates (Mihadhara).
Joseph M. Mutei,
St. Paul's University, Kenya

Shia Islam
Shi'a Islam in Kenya is represented primarily by a number of sects, who are largely the descendants of or influenced by Muslim traders from the Middle East and India who came to the East African coast for the either as indentured labourers or for the purposes of trade. The mainstream Shia IthnaAsheri sect is composed of Khojas who are of Indian descent and indigenous Kenyans. The Shia Ismaili sect is represented by Dawoodi Bohra, Mustaali Ismaili denomination and Khoja Ismailis, a Nizari Ismaili denomination both of Indian descent. Most of the Shia of Indian origin arrived in East Africa in the nineteenth century, primarily to landing in Zanzibar and Lamu. initially as traders, later branching into hardware and glass, and then into real estate and construction businesses. Today they are a vibrant part of the Kenyan economy in telecoms, information technology, manufacturing industry, logistics, import and export. Khoja Shia IthnaAsheris number some two thousand (Mombasa & Nairobi) and the indigenous Shia are thirty thousand (Nairobi, Mombasa, Nakuru & Lamu) most prominent amongst them is Shaykh Abdillahi Nassir, a Kenyan convert from Sunni to Shia Islam based in Mombasa and Seyyid Aidarus Alwy of Lamu. The Khoja Ismailia Community has a very small number and Dawoodi Bohra number some 6,500–8,000 in Kenya overall, with some 2,500 in Nairobi and under 3,000 in Mombasa. There are also some 200 members of a breakaway faction, the Progressive Dawoodi Bohra, in Nairobi.

Notable Muslims
 Habib Salih – scholar
 Khwaja Muhammad Latif Ansari – scholar
 Dekha Ibrahim Abdi – activist
 Yusuf Hassan Abdi – politician, diplomat, social activist, journalist
 Najib Balala – politician
 Mohamed Yusuf Haji – politician
 Ali Korane – politician
 Abdul Majid Cockar – lawyer, also served as Chief Justice of Kenya
 Asif Karim – cricketer
 Ragheb Aga – cricketer
 Irfan Karim – cricketer
 Omar Ahmed – boxer
 Shehzana Anwar – archer
 Sauda Rajab – businesswoman
 Rama Salim – footballer
 Awadh Saleh Sherman – businessman
 Amina Mohamed – politician

See also
Religion in Kenya

References

 
Kenya